Choi Won-hong (born December 14, 2000) is a South Korean actor. After discharged from the military in 2022, he signed a contract with Jung Man-sik's agency, Big Whale Entertainment.

Filmography

Television series

Film

Variety show

Awards and nominations

References

External links
 
 
 
 

2000 births
Living people
People from Suwon
South Korean male film actors
South Korean male television actors
South Korean male child actors